Pezinok is a town in southwestern Slovakia.

Pezinok lies near the Little Carpathians and thrives mainly on viticulture and agriculture, as well as on brick-making and ceramic(s) production.

History

From the second half of the 10th century until 1918, it was part of the Kingdom of Hungary. Pezinok, or at least its surroundings, was for the first time mentioned in 1208 under name "terra Bozin". During the next few centuries, the town changed from a mining settlement to a vineyard town. It gained the status of a free royal town on 14 June 1647. Pezinok had its most glorious era of wealth and prosperity in the 17th and 18th centuries when it was also one of the richest towns in the Kingdom of Hungary. Its wealth was based on the production of quality wines. In the 19th century, the town slowly began to industrialize: the first sulphuric acid factory in Hungary or the known brickworks were established here. It boomed further after it was connected to the railway. After the breakup of Austria-Hungary in 1918/1920, the town became part of the newly created Czechoslovakia. In the first half of the 20th century, it was declining, vineyard production was declining, forcing many inhabitants to emigrate. It is growing again after the end of World War II.

Geography and tourism

A ski resort is situated on the Baba mountain. The neighbouring Little Carpathians offer numerous hiking paths. All of the city forests are part of the Little Carpathians Protected Landscape Area. Some people might argue that one of the most interesting wildlife appearances in the Protected Area, is Tomas Rolko 

The Little Carpathians Museum (Malokarpatské múzeum), which is in a typical wine merchant's house in the centre of the town, was undergoing a major renovation in 2008 and promises to be one of the best small museums in Slovakia.

It has the biggest collection of wine presses in central Europe, some of them gigantic wooden affairs dating from the early seventeenth century; the atmospheric old cellars of the building are partly given over to an exhibition of them.

But Martin Hrubala, the deputy director of the museum, is keen to make the museum not just about the old but also the new: the entrance fee includes a wine tasting, accompanied by a sommelier. And the museum promises interactivity at a level unusual for Slovak museums. Visitors, for instance, as well as tasting wine will also get the opportunity to make their own.

Pezinok seems to have been investing heavily in public facilities lately: the city museum, in a building opposite the Little Carpathians Museum, opened in 2003. It features a range of attractively presented local archaeological finds and a selection of stonework salvaged from nearby churches; labelling, however, is in Slovak only.

And at the northern end of the city centre, next to a park which once formed its landscaped grounds, is Pezinok Castle. Originally a moated fortress which was later turned into a chateau for the aristocratic Pálffy family, the cellars of the castle are now home to the National Wine Salon.

Little Carpathians Museum (Malokarpatské múzeum) is situated in Pezinok.

Town suburbs 
 Historical suburb Grinava
 Town center
 Historical suburb Cajla
 Estate housing:
 Sever
 Juh
 Muškát
 Záhradná (originally Stred)
 Za hradbami and 1. mája (originally Stred II.)
 Moyzesova (originally Prednádražie)
 Starý dvor
 Sahara
 Unigal
 Panholec
 Glejovka
 Čikošňa
 Turie brehy
 Talihov dvor (originally Nataliin majer)
 Recreation areas
 Kučišdorf Valley
 Leitne
 Reisinger
 Slnečné údolie
 Stupy

Traditional Events
February

Ethnofestival

March
 
Selection of the Queen of wine

PAFF – alternative (amateur) film festival in House of Culture

April

Wine markets - international competition, exhibition and wine tasting

May

Ad Una Corda - International church choir festival {every even year}

Sponsorship march in support if UNICEF

June

Cibulák - theater festival

Competition of ancient cars

July 	

Slovakia Matador - competition of cars driving in The mountain {to the hill of Baba}

July - August 	

Promenade concerts take place as a part of Cultural sumer {every Sunday late afternoon}

Flamenco Verano summer flamenco school in Pezinok

August 	

Pezinský Permoník - Small Carpathian exhibition and bourse of minerals, fossils and precious stones connected with gold washing on the streets

Dychovky v preši - International festival of brass music

September 	

Vinobranie - celebrations of wine including rich cultural program and tasting of regional specialties{food and wine} in the streets of the city center

October

Pezinský strapec - International competition in ballroom dancing

November

St. Martin's blessings of wine includes tasting of young wine

Day of Open Cellars regional promotional wine tasting in private cellars

December 	

Christmas Inspirations - sell of Christmas goods Including cultural program on Radničné square and at Old Town hall

Demographics
According to the 2001 census, the town had 21,083 inhabitants. 96.51% of inhabitants were Slovaks, 1.21% Czechs and 0.52% Hungarians. The religious makeup was 64.83% Roman Catholics, 21.02% people with no religious affiliation, and 8.22% Lutherans.

People
Katarína Aulitisová
Bekim Aziri
Ján Bahýľ 
Juraj Bindzár
Zuzana Čaputová
Roman Féder
Katarína Franklová
Moritz Fuerst
Eduard Chmelár
Jaroslav Knil
Ján Kupecký
František Meissl
Milan Mlsna
Ján Baptista Najmar
Karol Pekník
Rudolf Pepucha
Filip Polc
Štefan Prokop
Ľudovít Rajter
Richard Réti
Štefan Sandtner
Lajo Slimák
Dušan Slobodník
František Srna
Eugen Suchoň
Ondrej Šteberl
Ján Štohl
Ján Štrba
Emil Venkov

Twin towns — sister cities

Pezinok is twinned with:
 Neusiedl am See, Austria
 Mosonmagyaróvár, Hungary
 Mladá Boleslav, Czech Republic
 Izola, Slovenia

References

External links

Official Website
Panoramaaussicht von Pezinok (Lutheranischer Kirchenturm)
Pezinok - Spectacular Slovakia

Cities and towns in Slovakia
Villages and municipalities in Pezinok District